Sarah Cooper (born 1977) is an American comedian, author, and video maker.

Sarah Cooper may also refer to:
 Sarah Brown Ingersoll Cooper (1835–1896), American philanthropist and educator
 Sarah Cooper (marmalade maker) (1848–1932), English marmalade maker
 Sarah Cooper (sport shooter) (born 1949), English sport shooter 
 Sarah Cooper (soccer) (born 1969), Australian footballer

See also
 Sara Cooper, American playwright and lyricist